Castilla y León is a Spanish geographical indication for Vino de la Tierra wines located in the autonomous region of Castile and León. Vino de la Tierra is one step below the mainstream Denominación de Origen indication on the Spanish wine quality ladder.

The area covered by this geographical indication comprises all the municipalities in Castile and León.

It acquired its Vino de la Tierra status in 2005.

References

Spanish wine
Wine regions of Spain
Wine-related lists
Appellations